Djadjawurrung (also Jaara, Ngurai-illam-wurrung) is an Aboriginal Australian language spoken by the Dja Dja Wurrung people of the Kulin nation of central Victoria. Djadjawurrung was spoken by 16 clans around Murchison, the central highlands region, east to Woodend, west to the Pyrenees, north to Boort and south to the Great Dividing Range.

Phonology

Consonants

Vowels 
There are four vowels noted: .

References

External links 
 Bibliography of Djadja Wurrung people and language resources, at the Australian Institute of Aboriginal and Torres Strait Islander Studies
 Dialects of Western Kulin, Western Victoria Yartwatjali, Tjapwurrung, Djadjawurrung

Kulin languages
Extinct languages of Victoria (Australia)